Azcue is a surname. Notable people with the surname include:

 Esteban Azcue (born 1944), Spanish sports shooter
 Joe Azcue (born 1939), Cuban baseball player